Barbara Cleverly is a British author born in Yorkshire and a former teacher. She graduated from Durham University and now works in Cambridgeshire. She is known for her Detective Joe Sandilands Mystery series, of which she has written thirteen books, and her Laetitia Talbot Mystery series. Shortlisted in 1999, Cleverly received the Crime Writers Association Ellis Peters Historical Dagger award in 2004. The Last Kashmiri Rose was a New York Times Notable Book. She lives in Cambridge, England.

Detective Joe Sandilands Mystery series
This series centers on Scotland Yard detective and World War I hero Joe Sandilands and is primarily set in colonial India and Europe of the 1920s and 1930s.

 The Last Kashmiri Rose (2001) 
 Ragtime In Simla (2002) 
 The Damascened Blade (2003) 
 The Palace Tiger (2004) 
 The Bee's Kiss (2005) 
 Tug of War (2006) 
 Folly Du Jour (2007) 
 Strange Images of Death (2010) 
 The Blood Royal (2011) 
 Not My Blood (2012) 
 A Spider in the Cup (2013) 
 Enter Pale Death (December 2014) 
 Diana's Altar (May 2016)

Laetitia Talbot Mystery series
Also set in the 1920s, this series centers on Laetitia Talbot, an archaeologist-turned-detective.

 The Tomb of Zeus (2007) 
 Bright Hair About the Bone (2008) 
 A Darker God (2010)

Other novels
 An Old Magic (2003) 
 Fall of Angels (May 2018) (An Inspector Redfyre Mystery #1) 
 Invitation to Die (August 2019) (An Inspector Redfyre Mystery #2)

Short story collections
 Ellie Hardwick Mysteries (2012), . Ellie Hardwick is a young architect dealing with ancient buildings in East Anglia, England. In her work, she finds an occasional corpse, ghost, or wrong-doer.
 Love–lies Bleeding
 Here Lies
 A threatened species
 A black tie affair
 Die like a maharajah
 The Cambridge Mysteries (2013), . Four short murder mysteries, three featuring Detective Sergeant Christina Kenton, set in Cambridgeshire, England.
 No Picnic For Teddy Bears
 In A Dark Issue
 The place: All Hallows church. The time: Halloween night
 And in Sweet Alison

Reviews
Publishers Weekly
Denver Post
The New York Times

References

English writers
Living people
Alumni of Durham University
Writers of historical mysteries
English women novelists
English mystery writers
Women mystery writers
Women historical novelists
1940 births